Germany competed at the 2012 Summer Olympics in London, from 27 July to 12 August 2012. This was the nation's sixth consecutive appearance at the Summer Olympics after its reunification in 1990. The German Olympic Sports Confederation (DOSB) sent the nation's smallest delegation to the Games since its reunification. A total of 392 athletes, 218 men and 174 women, competed in 23 sports, and were nominated by DOSB on four occasions.

Germany left London with a total of 44 medals (11 gold, 20 silver, and 13 bronze), finishing sixth in the overall medal standings. Eight of these medals were awarded to the team in athletics and canoeing, six in cycling, and four each in equestrian and judo. Seven German athletes won more than a single Olympic medal in London. In team sports, the men's field hockey team managed to defend its Olympic title from Beijing, winning the gold medal against the Netherlands. For the first time since 1932, Germany did not win an Olympic medal in swimming, except for the open water marathon.

Among the nation's medalists were equestrian rider Michael Jung, who led his eventing team to win its first Olympic gold medal in London, and track cyclist Kristina Vogel, who claimed the title in the women's team sprint, along with Miriam Welte. Discus thrower and pre-Olympic favorite Robert Harting celebrated his gold medal victory by ripping off his shirt and then running a hurdle lap. Meanwhile, gymnast Marcel Nguyen won two silver medals in men's all-around and men's parallel bars exercises. Table tennis player Dimitrij Ovtcharov led his team to win a bronze medal in the men's event. Other notable accomplishments included two gold medals won by rowers in men's eight and quadruple sculls, and three gold medals in sprint canoeing.

Medalists

| width="78%" align="left" valign="top" |

| width="22%" align="left" valign="top" |

Delegation
Deutscher Olympischer Sportbund (DOSB) selected a team of 392 athletes, 218 men and 174 women, to compete in 23 sports; it was the nation's smallest team sent to the Olympics after its reunification in 1990. Germany qualified teams only in field hockey, and men's indoor volleyball. Athletics was the largest team by sport, with a total of 77 competitors.

The German team featured twelve defending champions from Beijing, including judoka Ole Bischof, freestyle swimmer Britta Steffen, triathlete and two-time world champion Jan Frodeno, modern pentathlete Lena Schöneborn, and weightlifter Matthias Steiner. Other notable German athletes also included swimmer and world-record holder Paul Biedermann, gymnast and pre-Olympic favorite Marcel Nguyen, track cyclist and four-time World Cup champion Maximilian Levy, and open water swimmer Thomas Lurz, bronze medalist in Beijing.

Two naturalized German athletes made their sixth Olympic appearance as individuals: Mongolian-born pistol shooter Munkhbayar Dorjsuren, who won two Olympic bronze medals (including one from Beijing), and Uzbek-born gymnast Oksana Chusovitina, who won silver in the women's vault exercises. Other naturalized athletes included Kazakh-born marathon runner Irina Mikitenko, who competed at her fifth Olympics as an individual athlete, and Georgian-born trampoline gymnast Anna Dogonadze, who represented her current nation in four consecutive Olympic Games. Pistol shooter and triple Olympic gold medalist Ralf Schumann was at his seventh appearance, having participated at every Olympic Games since 1988 (his first under the former East Germany). Rifle shooters Maik Eckhardt and Sonja Pfeilschifter, on the other hand, made their fifth Olympic appearance, although the latter had participated in the Games since 1992. Equestrian eventing rider and Olympic gold medalist Peter Thomsen, at age 51, was the oldest athlete of the team, while gymnast Janine Berger was the youngest, at age 16.

Several German athletes also came from their families, who previously competed at the Summer Olympics. Ingrid Klimke, daughter of the late Reiner Klimke, and Meredith Michaels-Beerbaum, sister-in-law of four-time gold medalist Ludger Beerbaum, followed their families' role and tradition in participating at the Olympic Games and ultimately, in winning an Olympic equestrian medal. Natascha Keller, who competed at her fifth Olympics, succeeded her family's role to lead the national team in women's field hockey. Because of her sporting success and popularity, Keller became Germany's first female flag bearer at the opening ceremony since 2000, and the fourth in Olympic history.

| width=78% align=left valign=top |
The following is the list of number of competitors participating in the Games. Note that reserves in fencing, field hockey, football, and handball are not counted as athletes:

Archery

Germany had qualified the following archers.

Athletics

German athletes have so far achieved qualifying standards and DLV standards in the following athletics events (up to a maximum of 3 athletes in each event at the 'A' Standard, and 1 at the 'B' Standard):

Men
Track & road events

Field events

Combined events – Decathlon

Women
Track & road events

Field events

Combined events – Heptathlon

Badminton

Boxing

Germany has so far qualified boxers for the following events.
Men

Canoeing

Slalom

Sprint
Men

Women

Qualification Legend: FA = Qualify to final (medal); FB = Qualify to final B (non-medal)

Cycling

Road

Men

Women

Track
Sprint

Team sprint

Pursuit

Keirin

Omnium

Mountain biking

Förstemann was nominated in Mountain biking, but participated as track biker.

BMX

Diving

Germany has qualified 8 athletes, which includes two quota place in the men's 3 m springboard and two in the men's 10 m platform events;

Men

Women

Equestrian

Germany has qualified a complete team in all competitions (dressage, eventing, jumping). That makes a total of twelve athletes (3 in dressage, 5 in eventing, 4 in jumping).  Germany also qualified another dressage rider by rankings.

Dressage

* Anabel Balkenhol only competed as an individual and her scores did not count towards the team event.

The team event is decided after the second round by adding up the scores of rounds 1 and 2 for all three riders of a nation. The Freestyle only counts towards the individual ranking with the best 18 riders of round 2 advancing to the final. Scores are then cleared and only the score of the final round determines the individual ranking.

Eventing

"#" indicates that the score of this rider does not count in the team competition, since only the best three results of a team are counted.

* Dirk Schrade would have advanced to the final but for the rule that only the best three individual riders of a nation are allowed to advance.

** Ingrid Klimke withdrew in a bid to allow her Teammate Dirk Schrade to advance to the final, however the rules did not allow this and neither Klimke nor Schrade participated in the final in the end.

The team event is decided after the Jumping qualifier by adding up penalties of dressage, cross country and the first round of jumping. The best 25 riders are then allowed to advance to the individual final with the individual ranking decided by all penalties collected throughout the whole competition.

Show jumping

"#" indicates that the score of this rider does not count in the team competition, since only the best three results of a team are counted.

* Philipp Weishaupt was originally nominated to compete with his horse Monte Bellini. He had to withdraw after his horse contracted an infection a few days before the games. Meredith Michaels-Beerbaum replaced him in the individual and team event.

** Because of his low ranking in the first round, Christian Ahlmann did not advance to the individual final. He was however allowed to continue to compete in the team event (up until the team was eliminated) as the penalties of round 1 did not count towards the team ranking.

The team event is decided after the third round of the qualifier with the team score being determined by the penalties of rounds two and three. Only the best 35 riders (based on the cumulative scores of rounds 1 to 3) advance to the individual final. Before the final every rider's score is cleared with the individual ranking being determined by adding up the penalties of rounds A and B. If there is a tie, a jump-off takes place.

Fencing

Germany has qualified 12 fencers. An additional three fencers were nominated as alternate athletes for the team competitions.

Men

Women

Field hockey

Men's tournament

Germany has qualified a team in the men's event. Germany is in Pool B of the men's competition.

Roster

Group play

Semifinal

Final

Women's tournament

Germany has qualified a team in the women's event.

Roster

Group play

7th/8th place game

Gymnastics

Artistic
Men
Team

* Philipp Boy would have qualified for the individual final if not for the rule that only two participants of each nation are allowed to advance to the final (best 24 gymnasts in total).

Individual finals

Women
Team

Individual finals

Rhythmic

Trampoline

Judo

Men

Women

Modern pentathlon

Rowing

Men

Women

Qualification Legend: FA=Final A (medal); FB=Final B (non-medal); FC=Final C (non-medal); FD=Final D (non-medal); FE=Final E (non-medal); FF=Final F (non-medal); SA/B=Semifinals A/B; SC/D=Semifinals C/D; SE/F=Semifinals E/F; Q=Quarterfinals; R=Repechage

Sailing

Germany has qualified 1 boat for each of the following events

Men

Women

Open

M = Medal race; EL = Eliminated – did not advance into the medal race;

Shooting

Germany has qualified for 17 quota places in shooting events;

Men

Women

Swimming

DOSB has nominated the following swimmers:

Men

* advanced to the final despite only placing ninth in the semifinal due to higher placed swimmer pulling out of the final beforehand

Women

Qualification legend = S/O Swim-off;  WSO Win swim-off;  LSO Lost swim-off

Table tennis

Germany has qualified four athletes for singles table tennis events. Based on their world rankings as of 16 May 2011 Timo Boll and Dimitrij Ovtcharov have qualified for the men's event; Wu Jiaduo and Kristin Silbereisen have qualified for the women's.

Men

Women

Taekwondo

Germany has qualified 2 athletes.

Tennis

Men

Women

Mixed

Triathlon

Germany has qualified the following athletes.

Volleyball

Beach

Indoor
Germany qualified a men's team for the indoor tournament.
 Men's team event – 1 team of 12 players

Men's tournament

Team roster

Group play

Quarterfinal

Weightlifting

Germany has qualified 3 men and 2 women.

Wrestling

Men's freestyle

Men's Greco-Roman

Women's freestyle

References

External links
Official Homepage of the German Olympic Team (German)
Quota place by nation and name

Nations at the 2012 Summer Olympics
2012
2012 in German sport